Kenneth Del Vecchio is a filmmaker who has written, produced, directed and acted in over 30 films. He is founder and chairman of the Hoboken International Film Festival. He also is the author of several legal books, including criminal codebooks published by Prentice Hall and ALM. He is a novelist, who penned his first published novel as a 24-year-old law student. He is the owner of the Criminal Law Learning Center and a former part-time New Jersey municipal judge.

Films by Del Vecchio

The Life Zone
The Life Zone, starring Robert Loggia, Lindsay Haun, Angela Little, Martin Kove, Blanche Baker, and Nina Transfeld, tells the story of three women who have been kidnapped while they were getting abortions. They are forced by a mysterious jailer, played by Loggia, to bring their pregnancies to term, accompanied by a female doctor who also blames them because of their intentions to abort. While they wait to do so, they are given reading material and movies to watch about abortion and related issues, including material produced by Del Vecchio. Eventually, one of the women decide to give birth willingly, the other reluctantly decides to do so as well, and the third tries to force a miscarriage. Then it is revealed that the doctor and one of the pregnant women (the fiercest abortion advocate) are in Hell (the first for committing suicide and the second died during her abortion) and the man is supposed to be the devil and the other two are imaginary or fallen angels in disguise (who suddenly disappear). Other proposed explanation is that all three were in purgatory, and that the two who decided to give birth will go to Heaven while the third goes to Hell, to be subject to eternally repeated pregnancy and childbirth. The film also stars Amanda Antonucci, Blanche Baker and	Rebecca Baron.

A sequel, Cries of the Unborn was released in 2017, which reveals (or retcons) the supernatural ending of the previous movie as a prank for the purpose of psychological torture, and clarifies and affirms the prior film's apparent position in support of kidnapping in defense of the unborn. In the film, juries watch clips of the women's captivity and torture, and one-by-one decide acquit the abductors on all charges, reasoning that crimes committed to prevent abortions should be free from consequence. In the end, only one juror continues to assert that kidnapping and torture constitute crimes in this scenario. At the end of the film, the judge reveals himself to be God, and one of the jury members most committed to acquittal is revealed to be Jesus, and the juror voting to convict is condemned to hell.

Other films
An Affirmative Act is a pro-gay marriage film, starring Charles Durning, Eric Etebari, Costas Mandylor, Rachael Robbins, and Blanche Baker. It is about a lesbian couple, one of whom pretends to be a man in order for the two to get married and receive equal benefits.

The Great Fight, starring Robert Loggia, Joyce DeWitt, Charles Durning, Martin Kove, Angela Little, Rachael Robbins, and Eric Eteberai, is about an autistic savant who becomes an MMA fighter.

Fake, a film starring Fisher Stevens, Gabriel Mann, Jill Flint, and Robert Loggia, is about a prolific art forger.

O.B.A.M. Nude is a criticism of Barack Obama. The movie is about a college student, played by Del Vecchio, who makes a deal with the Devil to become President of the United States in exchange for millions of souls. The student goes to Harvard Law School and then becomes a community organizer.

Filmography

Film

Executive producer only
 Alone in the Dark II (2008)
 Here and There (2009)
 The Crimson Mask (2009)

Television

Bibliography

Pride & Loyalty (1997)
Revelation in the Wilderness (2000)
New Jersey Code of Criminal Justice: A Practical Guide (2004)
2009 New Jersey Code of Criminal Justice: A Practical Guide (2005)
Prentince Hall's Test Prep Guide to Accompany New Jersey Code of Criminal Justice (2006)
2008 New Jersey Code of Criminal Justice: A Practical Guide (2007)
Code of Criminal Justice: A Practical Guide to the Penal Statues (2008)
New York Code of Criminal Justice: A Practical Guide 2010 (2009)
The Great Heist (2011)
New Jersey Code of Criminal Justice: A Practical Guide 2015 (2016)
New Jersey Code of Criminal Justice: A Practical Guide 2017 (2017)
New York Code of Criminal Justice: A Practical Guide 2017 (2017)
New Jersey Code of Criminal Justice: A Practical Guide 2018 (2018)
New York Code of Criminal Justice: A Practical Guide 2018 (2018)
New Jersey Code of Criminal Justice: A Practical Guide 2019 (2019)

References

American film producers
American male actors
American male screenwriters
Living people
New Jersey state court judges
New Jersey Republicans
Municipal judges in the United States
Year of birth missing (living people)